This is a list of awards and nominations received by Tame Impala.

American Music Awards
The American Music Awards (the AMA's)  is an annual American music awards show, generally held in the Fall. It is one of Big Four Music Award Shows.

APRA Awards
The APRA Awards have been presented annually from 1982 by the Australasian Performing Right Association (APRA), "honouring composers and songwriters".

ARIA Awards
The ARIA Music Awards, hosted by the Australian Recording Industry Association (ARIA), recognise "excellence and innovation across all genres" of music in Australia.

Australian Music Prize
The Australian Music Prize (the AMP) is an annual award of $30,000 given to an Australian band or solo artist in recognition of the merit of an album released during the year of award. The commenced in 2005.

Billboard Music Awards
The Billboard Music Awards are given to artists based on sales data by Nielsen SoundScan and radio information by Nielsen Broadcast Data Systems.

Brit Awards
The Brit Awards are the British Phonographic Industry's (BPI) annual pop music awards.

EG Music Awards
The Age Music Victoria Awards are an annual Awards night celebrating Victorian music.

Grammy Awards
The Grammy Awards are awarded annually by The Recording Academy of the United States for outstanding achievements in the music industry.

J Awards
The J Awards were established by influential Australian youth radio station Triple J in 2005.
{| class="wikitable plainrowheaders" style="width:80%;
|-
! scope="col" style="width:4%;"| Year
! scope="col" style="width:50%;"| Category
! scope="col" style="width:35%;"| Nominated work
! scope="col" style="width:6%;"| Result
! scope="col" style="width:6%;"| 
|-
! scope="row"| 2010 
| rowspan="4"|Australian Album of the Year
| Innerspeaker 
| 
|  
|-
! scope="row"| 2012 
| Lonerism 
| 
|  
|-
! scope="row"| 2015 
| Currents 
| 
|  
|-
! scope="row"| 2020
| The Slow Rush 
| 
| 
|-

Helpmann Awards
The Helpmann Awards is an awards show, celebrating live entertainment and performing arts in Australia, presented by industry group Live Performance Australia since 2001. Note: 2020 and 2021 were cancelled due to the COVID-19 pandemic.
 

! 
|-
| 2014
| Tame Impala
| Helpmann Award for Best Australian Contemporary Concert
| 
| 
|-

MTV Awards

MTV Europe Music Awards
The MTV Europe Music Awards were established in 1994 by MTV Networks Europe to celebrate the most popular music videos in Europe.

MTV Video Music Awards
The MTV Video Music Awards were established in the end of the summer of 1984 by MTV to celebrate the top music videos of the year.

NME Awards
The NME Awards were created by the NME magazine and was first held in 1953.

Rolling Stone Australian Awards
Rolling Stone Australia Awards are awarded annually in January by the Rolling Stone (Australia) magazine since 2010 for outstanding contributions to popular culture in the previous year.
{| class="wikitable plainrowheaders" style="width:80%;
|-
! scope="col" style="width:4%;"| Year
! scope="col" style="width:50%;"| Category
! scope="col" style="width:35%;"| Nominated work
! scope="col" style="width:6%;"| Result
! scope="col" style="width:6%;"| 
|-
! scope="row"| 2011 
| rowspan="2"|Album of the Year
| Innerspeaker 
| 
|  
|-
! scope="row"| 2012 
| Lonerism 
| 
|  
|-
| 2021
| The Death of Me
| Best Record
| 
| 
|-

UK Music Video Awards
The UK Music Video Awards are British annual awards held to recognize creativity, technical excellence and innovation in music video and moving image for music.

WAMI Awards
WAMI began presenting awards in 2001 in Perth, representing local artists in the West Australian music scene.

References

Awards
Tame Impala